Trevor R. Stephan (born November 25, 1995) is an American professional baseball pitcher for the Cleveland Guardians of Major League Baseball (MLB). Stephan played college baseball for Hill College and the University of Arkansas. 
The New York Yankees selected Stephan in the third round of the 2017 MLB draft. He made his MLB debut in 2021.

Amateur career
Stephan attended Magnolia West High School in Magnolia, Texas. A three-year varsity starter for the baseball team, sophomore through his senior season. He played as a third baseman or first baseman and was the cleanup hitter in the batting order. In the last half of his high school senior season he was also used as a closing pitcher.

After graduating from Magnolia West, Stephan enrolled at Hill College. He played college baseball at Hill College as a pitcher for two years. In his freshman year, Stephan had a 0–1 win–loss record, 6.57 earned run average (ERA), and 19 strikeouts while pitching  total innings. Stephan was primarily used as a closing pitcher or late inning stopper in his sophomore year, amassing 29 appearances for second most nationally of all NJCAA D1 baseball pitchers in the 2016 season. He posted an 8–1 win–loss record, a 2.88 ERA, five saves, and 88 strikeouts in  innings pitched earning NTJCAC first team All-Conference honors.

The Boston Red Sox selected Stephan in the 18th round, with the 538th overall selection, of the 2016 MLB draft. He negotiated with the Red Sox, but opted not to sign with them, and instead transferred to the University of Arkansas. Pitching for the Arkansas Razorbacks in 2017, Stephan had a 6–3 win–loss record, a 2.87 earned run average, and 120 strikeouts in 91 innings pitched across 16 games started. His 120 strikeouts rank 5th and his 11.87 strikeouts per nine innings ranks 2nd in University of Arkansas baseball single season history. On May 9, 2017, the Southeastern Conference named Stephan their Pitcher of the Week.

Professional career

New York Yankees
The New York Yankees selected Stephan in the third round, with the 92nd overall selection, of the 2017 MLB draft. and he signed for $800,000. After signing, Stephan made his professional debut for the Gulf Coast Yankees of the Rookie-level Gulf Coast League. After one game, he was promoted to the Staten Island Yankees of the Class A Short Season New York-Penn League, where he spent the remainder of the season, going 1–1 with a 1.39 ERA and 0.80 WHIP in ten games (nine starts).

Stephan began the 2018 season with the Tampa Tarpons of the Class A-Advanced Florida State League. He had a 1.98 ERA in 41 innings with 49 strikeouts to nine walks. The Yankees promoted him to the Trenton Thunder of the Class AA Eastern League in May. In 24 starts between the two clubs, he was 6–9 with a 3.69 ERA. Stephan returned to Trenton to begin 2019.

Cleveland Indians / Guardians
The Cleveland Indians selected Stephan from the Yankees in the Rule 5 draft on December 10, 2020. He made Cleveland's 2021 Opening Day roster and made his MLB debut on April 3.

In 2022 he was 6-5 with a 2.69 ERA in 63.2 innings, with a 1.178 WHIP.

See also
Rule 5 draft results

References

External links

1995 births
Living people
Baseball players from Austin, Texas
Major League Baseball pitchers
Cleveland Indians players
Cleveland Guardians players
Hill College Rebels baseball players
Arkansas Razorbacks baseball players
Gulf Coast Yankees players
Staten Island Yankees players
Tampa Tarpons players
Trenton Thunder players